Abdul-Aziz bin Marzouq al-Tarifi (Arabic عبد العزيز بن مرزوق الطريفي)  (born 29 November 1976) is a Saudi Arabian Islamic Teacher.

Al-Tarefe is a Salafi scholar who is recognized for his knowledge in Hadith and Fiqh.

He is particularly known for his ability to recall from memory a hadith from the major hadith collections.

He was arrested in April 2016, though the reason for his arrest is still not fully known.

Biography 
Abdulaziz Al-Tarefe was born 29 November 1976, (7/12/1396 AH) in Kuwait. As a child, he moved between Kuwait and Mosul.

He settled in the Saudi capital, Riyadh.

Education 
Sheikh Abdul Aziz Al-Tarefe (also called as 'Abdul 'Aziz At-Turaifi) began memorising Islamic texts at the age of	13. Al-Tarefe finished his university studies at the College of Sharia at Imam Muhammad bin Saud Islamic University in the city of Riyadh.

Occupation

Sheikh Tarefe was a researcher for the Ministry	of the Islamic Affairs,	then the director of Studies and Research in the Center for Research and Studies, and then an Islamic researcher in this same center.

Arrest

It is alleged that on 23 April 2016, the Saudi police arrested him for tweets of violence.  he is still detained.

References

Living people
Kuwaiti Sunni clerics
Kuwaiti Salafis
Kuwaiti imams
Critics of Shia Islam
1976 births
Imam Muhammad ibn Saud Islamic University alumni
Saudi Arabian prisoners and detainees
Critics of atheism
Saudi Arabian people of Kuwaiti descent